Diseases, disorders, infections, and pathogens have appeared in fiction as part of a major plot or thematic importance. They may be fictional psychological disorders, magical, from mythological or fantasy settings, have evolved naturally, been genetically modified  (most often created as biological weapons), or be any illness that came forth from the (ab)use of technology.


In comics and literature

In film

In television

In video games

In role playing games

References

Further reading
  Disease in Fiction. Its place in current literature Nestor Tirard, 1886.
 Vital Signs Medical Realism in Nineteenth-Century Fiction Lawrence Rothfield, 1992. 
 Les malades imaginés: Diseases in fiction René Krémer. Journal: Acta Cardiologica, 2003.
 No Cure for the Future: Disease and Medicine in Science Fiction and Fantasy Gary Westfahl & George Slusser, 2002. 
 Nineteenth-Century Narratives of Contagion Allan Conrad Christensen, 2005. 
 The Thackery T. Lambshead Pocket Guide to Eccentric & Discredited Diseases Jeff VanderMeer & Mark Roberts (ed). 

List of fictional diseases
Diseases
Fictional